James Burt may refer to:

James Burt (broker) (1836–1892), American stock broker
James M. Burt (1917–2006), World War II Medal of Honor recipient
James C. Burt (1921–2012), American gynecologist who performed unconsented "love surgeries"
Jim Burt (sportscaster) (1918–1993), South Dakota, USA broadcast pioneer who served as sportscaster at KELO-AM and at KELO-TV
Jim Burt (American football) (born 1959), professional American football player for the New York Giants and San Francisco 49ers
James Burt (cricketer) (1792–1858), English amateur cricketer